Caterina Pico (della Mirandola) (1454 - 5 December 1501) was an Italian noblewoman.

Life
She was born in Mirandola, the eldest of the seven children of Gianfrancesco I Pico (1415-1467), lord of Mirandola and Concordia and of Giulia Boiardo, daughter of Feltrino count of Scandiano and cousin of the poet and writer Matteo Maria Boiardo. Her most notable sibling was the humanist and philosopher Giovanni Pico della Mirandola.

She married , lord of Carpi, with whom she had three children:

Caterina, nun
Lionello (?-1535)
Alberto (1475-1531), successor

She was widowed in 1480 and remarried in 1484 to Rodolfo Gonzaga (died 1495). He was killed at the battle of Fornovo. She inherited the fiefdom of Luzzara, which on her death passed to Gianfrancesco. She died in Luzzara.

1454 births
1501 deaths
House of Gonzaga
Italian nobility
People from Mirandola